George Frisbie Hoar (1826–1904) was a U.S. Senator from Massachusetts from 1877 to 1904. Senator Hoar may also refer to:

Ebenezer R. Hoar (1816–1895), Massachusetts State Senate
Roger Sherman Hoar (1887–1963), Massachusetts State Senate
Samuel Hoar (1778–1856), Massachusetts State Senate